Setaphyes is a genus of kinorhynchs within the family Pycnophyidae. There are currently 8 species assigned to the genus, with the most recent one being Setaphyes algarvensis in 2022.

Species 

 Setaphyes algarvensis 
 Setaphyes australensis 
 Setaphyes cimarensis 
 Setaphyes dentatus 
 Setaphyes elenae 
 Setaphyes flaveolatus 
 Setaphyes iniorhaptus 
 Setaphyes kielensis

References 

Kinorhyncha